Multitude: War and Democracy in the Age of Empire is a book by autonomous Marxist philosophers Antonio Negri and Michael Hardt that was published in 2004. It is the second installment of a "trilogy", also comprising Empire (2000)  and Commonwealth (2009).

Summary

Multitude is divided into three sections: "War," which addresses the current "global civil war";  "Multitude," which elucidates the "multitude" as an "active social subject, which acts on the basis of what the singularities share in common"; and, "Democracy," which critiques traditional forms of political representation and gestures toward alternatives.

Multitude addresses these issues and elaborates on the assertion, in the Preface to Empire, that:

"The creative forces of the multitude that sustain Empire are also capable of autonomously constructing a counter-Empire, an alternative political organization of global flows and exchanges."

Notes

Further reading
 Welsh, John. (2016) The shadow: alter-visibility in an empire of the seen. Distinktion 17(1): 57-77. .

External links

Review of Multitude, by Eric Mason
The village voice review, by John Giuffo
A deconstructive reading of Multitude
"The Collaborator and the Multitude: An Interview with Michael Hardt" Hardt talks about Multitude, the sequel to Empire. (2004)
 Timothy Rayner (2005). Refiguring the multitude: From exodus to the production of norms. Radical Philosophy 131.

2004 non-fiction books
Autonomism
Books about democracy
Books by Antonio Negri and Michael Hardt
Books about foreign relations of the United States
Books about imperialism
Imperialism studies